Gerónimo  Ramírez (middle of 17th century) was a Spanish painter of Seville. He was a pupil of Juan de las Roelas, likely brother of Felipe Ramírez . He painted the pope surrounded by cardinals and other personages for the church of the hospital de la Sangre, near Seville.

References

Painters from Seville
Spanish Baroque painters
Year of death missing
17th-century Spanish painters
Spanish male painters
Year of birth missing